The Resort is a 2021 American horror film written and directed by Taylor Chien. It stars Bianca Haase, Brock O'Hurn, Michael Vlamis, and Michelle Randolph. The movie was shot in 2019, and hip-hop artist Quavo helped produce it after being encouraged by main producer Will Meldman.

The film focuses on four friends who head to Hawaii to investigate reports of a haunting at an abandoned resort in hopes of finding the infamous "Half-Faced Girl".

Premise
A writer that studies horror fiction and her three friends travel to a Hawaiian island to investigate reports of a haunting at an abandoned hotel resort. When her friends surprise her for her birthday, Lex flies to a private and haunted island off Hawaii to get a story for her new book. The group starts off joking and playing in a scenic waterfall, but it quickly turns into a night of horror when they can't find the way they came, their flashlights are dying, and what can be only known as the Half-Face Girl from those very same ghost stories begins coming after them.

Bree is the first death, when a security car locks everyone but her out of it, the engine starts on its own and drives her off the resort balcony. After Chris confirms Bree's state, the three take off in order to exit and escape the Half-Face Girl. Sam is then possessed, causing concern for the rest of the group. He tries to strangle Chris, only for Lex to stab him in the neck with scissors. Due to his new nature, he doesn't quite die, and the Half-Face Girl rips off Sam's face. The latter, now on her side, stalks after Lex and Chris, who attempt to exit in an elevator. Chris sacrifices himself so that Lex can get up the elevator as the Half-Face Girl tries to climb up and reach her.

Upon exiting, she finds Bree, who is badly injured and blinded from the crash. She, seemingly possessed, sings happy birthday to Lex, before igniting a flame beneath herself. Lex narrates this all from a hospital bed to a skeptical detective, who's unsure how to take all that she's saying, especially since the photos she took aren't on her phone anymore. She claims back that it's also hard to watch all your friends die to something so unbelievable as well. When the detective gets up to make a call to his station, under the guise of scouring the island to help find whoever caused the deaths of her friends, Lex starts fooling with her camera. After taking a picture of the detective, she notices that he has similar veins to that of the possessed, and lowers her phones. The place around her crumbles, and it reveals she's still back at the resort. She never left.

Cast
 Bianca Haase as Lex
 Brock O'Hurn as Chris
 Michael Vlamis as Sam
 Michelle Randolph as Bree
 Dave Sheridan as Detective
 Dante Jimenez as Mike
 Romualdo Castillo as Henry 
 Andy Bumatai as Helicopter Pilot 
 Rebecca Jarvis as Jessica
 Avery Pascual as Sarah
 Casey Dacanay as Mrs. Kendall 
 Joaquin Veizaga as Preston
 Danika Massey as Paranormal P.I. Host
 Brandon B. Graham as The Haunting Of Kilahuna Narrator

Release
The film received a limited release in the United States on April 30, 2021, by Vertical Entertainment.

Reception

Bobby LePire of Film Threat gave it a 7.5 out of 10 and wrote: "The Resort takes a while to get to the good stuff, and the rhythm is interrupted every now and then. But the scares are effective, the cast does what they can with the material, and the cinematography is great.

References

External links
 

2021 films
2021 horror films
2021 independent films
American horror films
American independent films
Films about writers
Films set in Hawaii
Films set in hotels
Films shot in Hawaii
Films impacted by the COVID-19 pandemic
2020s English-language films
2020s American films